Kryptonite is a fictional material from the Superman comic book series.

Kryptonite may also refer to:

Arts and entertainment

Comics
 Kryptonite (story arc) a 2007–2008 Superman Confidential story arc
 Kryptonite Man, several DC Comics supervillains

Film and television
 Kryptonite!, a 2011 Italian film
 Kryptonita (English: Kryptonite), a 2015 Argentinian film
 "Kryptonite" (New Girl), a 2011 television episode

Music 
 Apollo (band), originally Kryptonite, a late-1970s American R&B/disco group 
 Kryptonite (album), by DJ Fresh, 2010
 "Kryptonite" (3 Doors Down song), 2000
 "Kryptonite" (Guy Sebastian song), 2004
 "Kryptonite (I'm on It)", a song by Purple Ribbon All-Stars, 2006
 "Kryptonite", a song by James Arthur, 2014
 "Kryptonite", a song by Mario from Go, 2007
 "Kryptonite", a song by Wayne Shorter from Schizophrenia, 1967

Other uses
 Kryptonite lock, a brand of bicycle lock
 Operation Kryptonite, a 2007 military operation by British, Dutch and Afghan forces

See also 
 Krypton (disambiguation)
 Jadarite, a mineral with a similar formula to the fictional kryptonite
 Pocket Full of Kryptonite, a 1991 album by the Spin Doctors